Attende, Domine is a Christian liturgical chant for the season of Lent, referred to in English as the Lent Prose. The themes of this hymn are the sinfulness of man and the mercy of God, a theological concept emphasised during Lent. The text is Mozarabic in origin and dates to the 10th century, and is sung to a Mode V Gregorian melody.

Text

Latin

℟. Attende, Domine, et miserere, quia peccavimus tibi.

Ad te Rex summe, omnium redemptor,oculos nostros sublevamus flentes:exaudi, Christe, supplicantum preces. ℟.
Dextera Patris, lapis angularis,via salutis, ianua caelestis,ablue nostri maculas delicti. ℟.
Rogamus, Deus, tuam maiestatem:auribus sacris gemitus exaudi:crimina nostra placidus indulge. ℟.
Tibi fatemur crimina admissa:contrito corde pandimus occulta:tua Redemptor, pietas ignoscat. ℟.
Innocens captus, nec repugnans ductus,testibus falsis pro impiis damnatus: quos redemisti, tu conserva, Christe. ℟.

English

℟. Hear us, O mighty Lord,show us your Mercy: Sinners we stand before you.

 To thee, Redeemer, on thy throne of glory: lift we our weeping eyes in holy pleadings: listen, O Jesu, to our supplications. ℟.
 O thou chief cornerstone, right hand of the Father: way of salvation, gate of life celestial: cleanse thou our sinful souls from all defilement. ℟.
 God, we implore thee, in thy glory seated: bow down and hearken to thy weeping children: pity and pardon all our grievous trespasses. ℟.
 Sins oft committed now we lay before thee: with true contrition, now no more we veil them: grant us, Redeemer, loving absolution. ℟.
 Innocent, captive, taken unresisting: falsely accused and for us sinners sentenced, save us, we pray thee, Jesu our Redeemer. ℟.

Adaptation by W.J. Birkbeck in The English Hymnal

External links
 - by Charles Jauquier
 by Schola Regina

References

Christian chants
Catholic music
Lent
Lenten hymns
10th-century Christianity
10th century in music